Mbonha is a river-side village in south-eastern Gabon. It is located in the Mouloundou Department in Ogooué-Lolo Province and is situated on the Ogooué River.

Nearby towns and villages include Kera-Kera (1.4 nm), Ngonga (1.0 nm), Bambora (1.4 nm), Lingoye (2.0 nm) and Mahouna (1.0 nm).

Populated places in Ogooué-Lolo Province
Mouloundou Department